Korney Ivanovich Chukovsky (31 March NS 1882 – 28 October 1969) was one of the most popular children's poets in the Russian language. His catchy rhythms, inventive rhymes and absurd characters have invited comparisons with the American children's author Dr. Seuss. Chukovsky's poems Tarakanishche ("The Monster Cockroach"), Krokodil ("The Crocodile"), Telefon ("The Telephone") and Moydodyr ("Wash-'em-Clean") have been favorites with many generations of Russophone children. Lines from his poems, in particular Telefon, have become universal catch-phrases in the Russian media and everyday conversation. He adapted the Doctor Dolittle stories into a book-length Russian poem as Doctor Aybolit ("Dr. Ow-It-Hurts"), and translated a substantial portion of the Mother Goose canon into Russian as Angliyskiye Narodnyye Pesenki ("English Folk Rhymes"). He also wrote very popular translations of Walt Whitman, Mark Twain, Oscar Wilde, Rudyard Kipling, O. Henry, and other authors, and was an influential literary critic and essayist.

Early life

Originally named Nikolay Vasilyevich Korneychukov, the writer reworked his original family name into his now familiar pen-name while working as a journalist at Odessa News in 1901. He was born in Saint Petersburg as the illegitimate son of Ekaterina Osipovna Korneychukova  and of Emmanuil Solomonovich Levenson, a man from a wealthy Russian Jewish family (his legitimate grandson was mathematician Vladimir Rokhlin). Levenson's family did not permit his marriage to Korneychukova, and the couple was eventually forced to separate. Korneychukova moved to Odesa with her two children, Nikolay and his sister Marussia. Levenson supported them financially for some time, until his marriage to another woman. Nikolay studied at the Odesa gymnasium, where one of his classmates was Vladimir Ze'ev Jabotinsky. Later, the gymnasium expelled Nikolay for his "low origin" (a euphemism for illegitimacy). He had to obtain his secondary-school and university diplomas by correspondence.

He taught himself English and, in 1903–05, he served as the London correspondent of an Odesa newspaper, although he spent most of his time at the British Library instead of in the parliamentary press gallery. Back in Russia, Chukovsky started translating English works and published several analyses of contemporary European authors, which brought him in touch with leading personalities of Russian literature and secured the friendship of Alexander Blok. Chukovsky's English was not idiomatic - he had taught himself to speak it by reading and he thus pronounced English words in a distinctly odd manner, and it was difficult for people to understand him in England. His influence on Russian literary society of the 1890s is immortalized by satirical verses of Sasha Chorny, including Korney Belinsky (an allusion to the famous critic Vissarion Belinsky (1811-1848)). Korney Chukovsky published several notable literary titles, including From Chekhov to Our Days (1908), Critique stories (1911) and Faces and masks (1914). He also published a satirical magazine called Signal (1905–1906) and was arrested for "insulting the ruling house", but was acquitted after six months of investigative incarceration.

Later life and works

It was at that period that Chukovsky produced his first fantasies for children. The girl from his famous novel 'The Crocodile' was inspired by Lyalya, daughter of his long-time friend, publisher Zinovii Grzhebin. As the 2004 Encyclopædia Britannica put it, "clockwork rhythms and air of mischief and lightness in effect dispelled the plodding stodginess that had characterized pre-revolutionary children's poetry." Subsequently, they were adapted for theatre and animated films, with Chukovsky as one of the collaborators. Sergei Prokofiev and other composers even adapted some of his poems for opera and ballet. His works were popular with emigre children as well, as Vladimir Nabokov's complimentary letter to Chukovsky attests.

During the Soviet period, Chukovsky edited the complete works of Nikolay Nekrasov and published From Two to Five (1933), a popular guidebook to the language of children. As his invaluable diaries attest, Chukovsky used his popularity to help the authors persecuted by the regime including Anna Akhmatova, Mikhail Zoshchenko, Alexander Galich and Aleksandr Solzhenitsyn. He was the only Soviet writer who officially congratulated Boris Pasternak on winning the Nobel Prize. His daughter, Lydia Chukovskaya, is remembered as a noted writer, memoirist, philologist and lifelong assistant and secretary of the poet Anna Akhmatova. Chukovsky's son Nikolai was a military writer, his son Boris lost his life while serving in the army during World War II, and his daughter Maria died in her childhood from tuberculosis.

At one point his writings for children were under severe criticism. Nadezhda Krupskaya was an initiator of this campaign, but criticism also came also from children's writer Agniya Barto.

Chukovsky extensively wrote about the translation process and critiqued other translators. In 1919, he co-wrote with Nikolay Gumilyov a brochure called Printsipy khudozhestvennogo perevoda (English: Principles of Artistic Translation). In 1920, Chukovsky revised it, and he substantially rewrote and expanded it numerous times throughout his life without Gumilyov. Chukovsky's subsequent revisions were done in 1930 (re-titling it Iskusstvo perevoda [English: The Art of Translation]), 1936, 1941 (re-titling it Vysokoe iskusstvo [English: A High Art]), 1964, and his final revision was published in his Collected Works in 1965-1967. In 1984, Lauren G. Leighton published her English translation of Chukovsky's final revision, and titled it The Art of Translation: Kornei Chukovsky's A High Art.

Starting in the 1930s, Chukovsky lived in the writers' village of Peredelkino near Moscow, where he is now buried.

For his works on the life of Nekrasov he was awarded a Doktor nauk in philology. He also received the Lenin Prize in 1962 for his book, Mastery of Nekrasov and an honorary doctorate from University of Oxford in 1962.

References

Sources

External links

Works by Chukovsky
Popular works by Chukovsky , at Ryfma.com (in Russian)
Живой как жизнь ('Alive as life itself'), a humorous and anti-prescriptivist discussion of the Russian language 
Selected works of Chukovsky, at the Stikhiia poetry archive

Works about Chukovsky
Chukfamily.ru Materials about three generations of the Chukovsky family: Korney, Lidiya and Elena 
Biography of Chukovsksy 
"On the 120th Anniversary of Chukovsky's Birth", by essayist Dmitrii Bykov 

1882 births
1969 deaths
Writers from Saint Petersburg
People from Sankt-Peterburgsky Uyezd
Russian people of Jewish descent
Writers from the Russian Empire
Soviet poets
Soviet children's writers
Children's poets
Soviet literary historians
Soviet male writers
Soviet essayists
Lenin Prize winners
Recipients of the Order of Lenin
Recipients of the Order of the Red Banner of Labour
Literary translators
English–Russian translators
Translators from English
Translators of Oscar Wilde